Our Lady College is a private Catholic primary and secondary school in Antwerp, Belgium. The school was founded by the Society of Jesus in 1575 and the school building was designed by Jules Bilmeyer, completed in 1875.

History
In 1575, the Jesuits opened their first school in the city in a building that became part of the Lessius Hogeschool. After war with Spain in 1576, the Jesuits had to leave the city, but returned in 1585 and reopened the school.

In 1607 and again in 1655, the school had to move to larger premises to keep up with the expanding population. 

In 1773, Pope Clement IV ordered for all Jesuit educational services to cease. The Jesuits did not return to Antwerp until 1840, when they reopened the college. It was situated in what is now a restaurant for students of the University of Antwerp.

In 1871, the capacity of the school again needed to be increased so land was bought in a series of streets in the centre of Antwerp called 'the Avenues'. There, they got the architect Jules Bilmeyer to design the new school. It was completed in 1875. Twelve years later, he also completed the building of the church next door to the school, Our Lady of Grace Church.

Notable alumni

 Tom Barman
 Luc Bertrand
 Christian de Duve
 Gabriel Fehervari
 Jef Geeraerts
 Count Albert Le Grelle
 Mgr Stanislas Le Grelle
 Count Bernard Le Grelle
 Jan Leyers
 Daniel Cardon de Lichtbuer

Gallery

See also

 Education in Belgium
 Roman Catholicism in Belgium
 List of Jesuit schools

References

External links
 Our Lady College site

Jesuit primary schools in Belgium
Schools in Antwerp
Jesuit secondary schools in Belgium
1575 establishments in Europe
Educational institutions established in the 1570s